Poetica (All Beauty Sleeps) is the eleventh album by Sopor Æternus & the Ensemble of Shadows. The album consists of musical adaptations of Poe's poems, some of them already made by Cantodea in previous albums: "Dreamland" is found on Todeswunsch under the title of "Die Bruderschaft des Schmerzes"; "Alone" on Voyager: The Jugglers of Jusa; "The Sleeper" on Dead Lovers' Sarabande (Face One); and "The Conqueror Worm" on Flowers in Formaldehyde. However, all the musical arrangements were redone in the new versions.

The album was released in September 2013 in two different formats: in compact disc format with an opulent hardcover photo book of 156 pages (28 x 28 cm), and an exclusive T-shirt (limited to 1999 copies); and on 12-inch vinyl with two posters, exclusive artwork by Natalie Shau and Keith Thompson, and a different T-shirt (limited to 890 copies.)  Both editions were signed and numbered by Anna-Varney Cantodea herself. Additionally, the album was released via Bandcamp for digital download.

Track listing

Personnel 
Nikos Mavridis: Violin 
Tim Ströble: Cello
Patrick Damiani: Bass, Lute, Recording, Mixing
Jonas Schira: Cornet
Michael Fütterer: Trombone
Patrick Chirilus-Bruckner: Tuba
Robin Schmidt: Mastering
Anna-Varney Cantodea: Vocals, All other instruments, Programming, Mixing

Notes

2013 albums
Sopor Aeternus and The Ensemble of Shadows albums